Bâlines is a commune in the Eure department in Normandy in northern France.

In February 2021 the village was the site of a fire in which a house with a thatched roof burned down. The village was home to an animal park called Le Bois des Aigles. The park was the subject of the seizure of 69 birds due to alleged animal-trafficking in January 2018, as of early 2020 no charges had been brought against the operators of the park. The park was forced to close during the 2019 heatwave due to excessive heat. The park was subsequently re-opened in 2020 as Domaine de la forêt enchantée, a halloween-themed amusement attraction.

Population

See also
Communes of the Eure department

References

Communes of Eure